The 1963 Men's European Volleyball Championship was the sixth edition of the event,  organized by Europe's governing volleyball body, the Confédération Européenne de Volleyball. It was hosted in various cities in Romania from October 21 to November 2, 1963, with the final taking place in Bucharest.

Teams

Final ranking

References
 Results

Men's European Volleyball Championships
European Championship
Mens European Volleyball Championship, 1963
International volleyball competitions hosted by Romania
Sports competitions in Bucharest
1960s in Bucharest
October 1963 sports events in Europe
November 1963 sports events in Europe